Sister Act is an American media franchise created by Paul Rudnick and currently consisting of two films: Sister Act (1992), Sister Act 2: Back in the Habit (1993), and a Broadway musical.

Films

Sister Act (1992)

When a lively lounge singer Deloris Van Cartier (Whoopi Goldberg) sees her mobster beau, Vince LaRocca (Harvey Keitel), commit murder, she is relocated for her protection. Set up in the guise of a nun in a California convent, Deloris proceeds to upend the quiet lives of the resident sisters. In an effort to keep her out of trouble, they assign Deloris to the convent's choir, an ensemble that she soon turns into a vibrant and soulful act that gains widespread attention.

The film was one of the most financially successful comedies of the early 1990s, grossing $231 million worldwide.

Sister Act 2: Back in the Habit (1993)

In the sequel, Las Vegas performer Deloris Van Cartier (Whoopi Goldberg) is surprised by a visit from her nun friends, including Sister Mary Patrick (Kathy Najimy) and Sister Mary Lazarus (Mary Wickes). She soon finds out that she is needed in her nun guise as Sister Mary Clarence to help teach music to teens at a troubled school in hopes of keeping the facility from closing at the hands of Mr. Crisp (James Coburn), a callous administrator.

Despite being a moderate commercial success, grossing over $57 million  in the United States, the film was a critical failure.

Future

Possible remake (TBA)
On June 3, 2015, a remake was confirmed to be in the works with Legally Blonde screenwriters Kirsten Smith and Karen McCullah writing.

Sister Act 3 (TBA)
When asked in a 2013 appearance on Watch What Happens Live about acting in a sequel, Whoopi Goldberg initially refused, citing the passing of so many of her nun co-stars, stating "it's not Sister Act without them." But during a 2015 appearance on Watch What Happens Live, she changed her stance to a maybe, stating:
After a Broad City cameo in 2016, Goldberg expressed doubts about a sequel based on missing cast members, but said she thought it would be fun and likable. In May 2017, she affirmed her desire for the third film to happen, adding in July that she would like to direct it and had confidence it would be made. On December 7, 2018, it was confirmed that Regina Y. Hicks and Karin Gist were hired to write the script to Sister Act 3 with it being planned for a release on Disney+. Goldberg confirmed again on October 7, 2020, during an appearance on The Late Late Show with James Corden that she is working on the sequel and wants to bring as many of the original cast back for it as possible.

In December 2020, it was revealed that Goldberg had officially signed on to return as Delores and that Tyler Perry would be producing and directing the film.

Reworked musical
A reworked version of the musical is expected to debut at the Curve, Leicester starring Brenda Edwards and produced by Whoopi Goldberg and Jamie Wilson.

Other media

Musical

The musical Sister Act, directed by Peter Schneider and choreographed by Marguerite Derricks, premiered at the Pasadena Playhouse in Pasadena, California on October 24, 2006 and closed on December 23, 2006. It broke records, grossing $1,085,929 to become the highest grossing show ever at that venue. The production then moved to the Alliance Theater in Atlanta, Georgia, where it ran from January 17 to February 25, 2007.

The musical then opened at the West End at the London Palladium on June 2, 2009, following previews from May 7. The production  was directed by Peter Schneider produced by Whoopi Goldberg together with the Dutch company Stage Entertainment, and choreographed by Anthony Van Laast, with set design by Klara Zieglerova, costume design by Lez Brotherston, and lighting design by Natasha Katz. Following a year-long search, 24-year-old actress Patina Miller was cast as Deloris, alongside Sheila Hancock as the Mother Superior, Ian Lavender as Monsignor Howard, Chris Jarman as Shank, Ako Mitchell as Eddie, Katie Rowley Jones as Sister Mary Robert, Claire Greenway as Sister Mary Patrick, and Julia Sutton as Sister Mary Lazarus. The musical received four Laurence Olivier Awards nominations including Best Musical. On October 30, 2010, the show played its final performance at the London Palladium and transferred to Broadway.

The musical opened at the Broadway Theater on April 20, 2011, with previews beginning March 24, 2011. Jerry Zaks directed the Broadway production with Douglas Carter Bean rewriting the book. Patina Miller, who originated the role of Deloris in the West End production, reprised her role, making her Broadway debut. She was later replaced by Raven Symone, also making her Broadway debut. The original Broadway cast featured Victoria Clark (Mother Superior), Fred Applegate (Monsignor), Sarah Bolt, (Sister Mary Patrick), Chester Gregory (Eddie), Kingsley Leggs (Curtis), Marla Mindelle (Sister Mary Robert), and Audrie Neenan (Sister Mary Lazarus). The musical received five Tony Award nominations including Best Musical.

The musical closed in August 2012 after playing 561 performances.

Cast and characters
A dark grey cell indicates the character was not in the media

Crew

References

External links

 
Internet Broadway Database
Sister Act Nun Run
New York Times, November 13, 2008

Franchises
Walt Disney Studios (division) franchises
Film series introduced in 1992